The Swift Current Broncos were a Canadian Junior "A" ice hockey team based out of Swift Current, Saskatchewan that played in the Saskatchewan Junior Hockey League from 1974 to 1986.  From 1983 to 1986, the team was known as the Swift Current Indians.

History
The Swift Current Broncos of the Saskatchewan Junior Hockey League were created in the wake of the Western Canada Hockey League's (WCHL) Swift Current Broncos departure to  Lethbridge in 1974.  The new SJHL team adopted the nickname "Broncos" for its first nine seasons, from the 1974-75 through the 1982–83 seasons, despite the fact that another SJHL team, the Humboldt Broncos, was already using the same nickname.  In addition to regular season games, these competing Broncos teams met four times in the SJHL playoffs (1976, 1978, 1979, 1981).

The Swift Current team changed its nickname to the "Indians" for their final three SJHL seasons, from 1983 to 1984 through 1985–86. The SJHL team folded in 1986 when the original WCHL (by then renamed the Western Hockey League) Broncos returned to the City of Swift Current in 1986.

The Broncos won the SJHL Championship in their first ever season in the league. Ten out of twelve of Swift Current's seasons were winning seasons.

Season-by-season standings

Playoffs
1975 Won League, Lost Anavet Cup
Swift Current Broncos defeated Regina Blues 4-games-to-2
Swift Current Broncos defeated Weyburn Red Wings 4-games-to-1
Swift Current Broncos defeated Prince Albert Raiders 4-games-to-2 SJHL CHAMPIONS
Selkirk Steelers (MJHL) defeated Swift Current Broncos 4-games-to-none
1976 Lost Semi-final
Swift Current Broncos defeated Humboldt Broncos 4-games-to-2
Prince Albert Raiders defeated Swift Current Broncos 4-games-to-none
1977 Lost Semi-final
Swift Current Broncos defeated Battleford Barons 4-games-to-1
Prince Albert Raiders defeated Swift Current Broncos 4-games-to-1 
1978 Lost Semi-final
Swift Current Broncos defeated Humboldt Broncos 4-games-to-none
Prince Albert Raiders defeated Swift Current Broncos 4-games-to-3
1979 Lost Semi-final
Swift Current Broncos defeated Humboldt Broncos 4-games-to-3
Prince Albert Raiders defeated Swift Current Broncos 4-games-to-3
1980 Lost Semi-final
Swift Current Broncos defeated Battleford Barons 4-games-to-1
Prince Albert Raiders defeated Swift Current Broncos 4-games-to-2
1981 Lost Quarter-final
Humboldt Broncos defeated Swift Current Broncos 4-games-to-none
1982 Lost Semi-final
Swift Current Broncos defeated Saskatoon Olympics 4-games-to-2
Prince Albert Raiders defeated Swift Current Broncos 4-games-to-none
1983 Lost Quarter-final
Melville Millionaires defeated Swift Current Broncos 4-games-to-none
1984 DNQ
1985 Lost Quarter-final
Humboldt Broncos defeated Swift Current Indians 4-games-to-2
1986 Lost Semi-final
Swift Current Indians defeated Battlefords North Stars 4-games-to-2
Humboldt Broncos defeated Swift Current Indians 4-games-to-none

External links
SJHL Website

Defunct Saskatchewan Junior Hockey League teams
Swift Current